Michael Lawrence Klein  (born March 13, 1940 in London, England) is Laura H. Carnell Professor of Science and Director of the Institute for Computational Molecular Science in the College of Science and Technology at Temple University in Philadelphia, USA. He was previously the Hepburn Professor of Physical Science in the Center for Molecular Modeling at the University of Pennsylvania. Currently, he serves as the Dean of the College of Science and Technology and has since 2013.

Education and early life
Klein, a British native, was naturalized in the United States in 1993. Klein obtained a B.Sc. from the University of Bristol in 1961, followed by a Ph.D. in 1964. His research career includes the fields of chemistry and physics. Klein was a CIBA-Geigy Research Fellow of Physics at the University of Genoa in Italy from 1964-1965. Then went on to complete his chemistry research as an ICI Research Fellow at the University of Bristol from 1965-1967. His education and career then moved to the United States in 1967 where he served as a Research Associate of Physics at Rutgers University in New Jersey.

Career
Klein was a researcher at the National Research Council of Canada from 1968-1987 and joined the faculty of the University of Pennsylvania in 1987. Klein's research in computational chemistry, particularly statistical mechanics, intermolecular interactions, and modeling of condensed phases and biophysical systems, is among the most highly cited in the field. He received the Aneesur Rahman prize in 1999, which is the highest honor given by the American Physical Society
for work in computational physics, and was elected to the United States National Academy of Sciences in 2009.

Research 
Klein has advanced the field of computer simulation and modelling of molecular systems over a broad front. His early works focused on developing pragmatic intermolecular force fields to be used in computer simulation Monte Carlo and molecular dynamics (MD) simulations of molecular systems, such as water and aqueous solutions. During the 1980’s and early 1990’s his group developed and elaborated algorithms and methodologies to enable the efficient and rigorous computer simulation of macromolecular systems. These seminal works have been influential and are very highly cited because of their broad utility. Every modern MD simulation code employs these algorithms in one form or other. Thus, modern molecular simulation studies of chemical systems ranging from surfactants to proteins and from lipid membranes to energy materials - including solid electrolyte fuel cells, and so-called “green” ionic liquids - take advantage of these algorithms. His pioneering simulation studies of surfactants, lipid membranes, and membrane-bound ion channels are noteworthy.

ISI ratings 
Google Scholar lists more than 1,200 items (publications, abstracts, & reports), of which 697 have 10 or more citations each. Hirsch Index, h-index = 124. Total Citations are almost 108,000, increasing by about 7,000/year. His publication on Classical Monte Carlo simulations in The Journal of chemical physics has been cited over 35,000 times.

Awards and honors

Memberships 

 2018 Elected Foreign Member: Chemical Sciences, Academia Europaea (MAE)
 2015 Honorary Fellowship, JNCASR Bangalore India
 2015 Elected Fellow, The American Association for Advancement of Science
 2013 Honorary Fellow, Trinity College Cambridge UK
 2009 International Review UK Chemistry Research Panel Chair
 2008 Elected Fellow, The Chemical Research Society of India (CRSI)
 2008 Fellow, The Mongolian National Academy of Sciences
 2008 BESAC Sub-committee Member 
 2006 Elected Honorary Fellow, The Indian Academy of Sciences (IAS)
 2006 Elected Honorary Member, The Materials Research Society of India (MRSI)
 2004 Elected Fellow, The World Academy of Sciences (TWAS)
 2003 Elected Fellow, The Royal Society of Chemistry UK (FRSC)
 2003 Elected Fellow, The Institute of Physics, UK
 2003 Elected Fellow, The Royal Society of London (FRS)
 2003 Elected Member, The American Academy of Arts and Sciences
 2002 International Review UK Chemical Sciences Panel Member
 2001-2003 NSF Blue Ribbon Panel on Cyberinfrastructure Panel Member
 1997 Honorary Fellow Sidney Sussex College, University of Cambridge UK
 1991 Elected Fellow, The American Physical Society
 1989 Guggenheim Fellow, University of Florence
 1985 Fellow Commoner, Trinity College Cambridge UK
 1984 Elected Fellow, The Royal Society of Canada (FRSC)
 1979 Elected Fellow, The Chemical Institute of Canada
 1970 IBM World Trade Fellow, San Jose, CA

Other awards and honors 
2020 John Scott Award & Medal
2017 Honorary D.Sc., University of St. Andrews, Scotland
2014 C.V. Raman Chair, The Indian Academy of Sciences
2013 Medal Lecturer, The World Academy of Sciences (TWAS)
2011 Boys – Rahman Medal, The Royal Society of Chemistry UK
2008 Peter Debye Award in Physical Chemistry, The American Chemical Society
2008 Hinshelwood Lectures, University of Oxford, UK
2004 CECAM Prize, The European Physical Society
2003 Schlumberger Visiting Professor, Universities of Oxford & Cambridge UK
1999 American Physical Society Award in Computational Physics
1997 Linnett Lectures University of Cambridge UK 
1997 Miller Visiting Professor, University of California Berkeley
1995 Humboldt Research Award, MPI Stuttgart Germany
1988 Néel Visiting Professor, ENS Lyon France
1982 Visiting Professor, Australian National University, Canberra Australia
1982 JSPS Visiting Professor, University of Kyoto, Japan
1975 Visiting Professor, Université Paris VI France

References

1940 births
Living people
Alumni of the University of Bristol
American physical chemists
University of Pennsylvania faculty
Fellows of the Royal Society
Members of the United States National Academy of Sciences
Computational chemists
Fellows of the American Physical Society